Kanmantoo is an interim Australian bioregion located in South Australia. The bioregion is part of the Mount Lofty woodlands ecoregion.

Kanmantoo is made up of two subregions – Fleurieu and Kangaroo Island.

See also

 Geography of Australia

References

Biogeography of South Australia
IBRA regions
Kangaroo Island
Mediterranean forests, woodlands, and scrub in Australia